Mythimna oxygala, the lesser wainscot, is a species of cutworm or dart moth in the family Noctuidae.

The MONA or Hodges number for Mythimna oxygala is 10436.

References

Further reading

External links

 

Noctuinae
Articles created by Qbugbot
Moths described in 1881